The Penfold Professional Golf League was a professional golf tournament played in England. The event was held twice, in 1938 and 1939. It was contested by 12 players, each playing the other in a round robin format. Everyone played two matches per day for the first five days and another match on the final day, a Saturday. Two points were awarded for a win and one point for a halved match. Total prize money was £1,000 with £200 for the winner. The tournament was sponsored by Penfold Golf.

1938
The event was held at Sandy Lodge Golf Club in Northwood, London from 13–18 June. The field consisted of the leading 11 in the 1937 Harry Vardon Trophy standings together with Percy Alliss who had won the 1937 News of the World Matchplay. The Harry Vardon Trophy standings were based on the average score in major stroke play events during the season. The winner of the Yorkshire Evening News Tournament also qualified but since the winner, Arthur Lacey, finished fourth in the averages, there were places for the leading 11 in the averages.

Final table

1939
The event was held at Little Aston Golf Club in Sutton Coldfield, Staffordshire from 12–17 June. The field consisted of the defending champion, Percy Alliss and the leading 11 in the 1938 Harry Vardon Trophy standings. As in 1937 the Harry Vardon Trophy standings were based on the average score in major stroke play events during the season.

Final table

Winners

References

Golf tournaments in England